The Green Mountain Inn is located on Main Street (Vermont Route 100) in Stowe, Vermont, United States. Built in 1833, it stands near the intersection of Route 100 and Mountain Road (Route 108). The main inn building, the former Depot buildings and Sanborn House are listed on the National Register of Historic Places as part of the Stowe Village Historic District.

The inn has 104 rooms in its eight buildings, up from 64 rooms in 1994 and 76 rooms in 1998.

It contains the Whip Bar & Grill restaurant, which features beams from a large stable that formerly stood on the site of the inn's annex wing and which was torn down in 1953 due to its being a fire risk.

History 
The building's construction was completed in 1833 by Peter C. Lovejoy (1783–1874). Churchill added wings, made of brick, a dance hall and a two-storey front porch. He named it Mansfield House. Churchill forfeited ownership in a foreclosure to W. H. H. Bingham, from whom he had previously borrowed money.

Mansfield House was run as a hotel. After it was sold to W. P. Bailey, it became known as the Brick Hotel. It received its current name in 1893, when it was bought by Mark C. Lovejoy (1862–1937).

The Depot Street building was added in 1897, becoming the home of the Mount Mansfield Electric Railroad. Depot Street passes between the inn and the Depot building today. Sanborn House was purchased, and it became a blacksmith and livery.

Chester A. Arthur, 21st U.S. president, once performed in a theatrical production at the inn. Another president, Gerald Ford, visited as part of a Look magazine feature on the town. He posed for photographs in various locations.

Marvin Gameroff, a Canadian who visited the town and fell in love with it, purchased the inn in 1982. It was later transferred to the Gameroff Trust, which still owns the inn.

Beginning in 1983, the building's 150th anniversary, a major renovation project was begun to restore the main inn and Depout Building.

Depot Street building

References

External links 
 

Buildings and structures in Stowe, Vermont
Hotels in Vermont
Hotels established in 1833
Hotel buildings on the National Register of Historic Places in Vermont